Justine Lacoste-Beaubien (October 1, 1877 – January 17, 1967) was one of the founders of the children's hospital Sainte-Justine Hospital.

Born in Montreal, the daughter of Alexandre Lacoste and Marie-Louise Globensky, she married Louis de Gaspé-Beaubien, son of Hon. Louis Beaubien, in 1899. Her maternal great-grandfather was born in Berlin to a family of Polish origin.

In 1934 Lacoste-Beaubien was made an Officer of the Order of the British Empire "for services for sick and crippled children; in founding and extending the St. Justine Hospital".

Further reading

References

Lacoste family
Beaubien-Casgrain family
Globensky family
1877 births
1967 deaths
Canadian people of Polish descent
Canadian Officers of the Order of the British Empire
People from Montreal
Philanthropists from Quebec
Burials at Notre Dame des Neiges Cemetery